The Yaka are an African ethnic group found in southwestern Democratic Republic of the Congo, with Angola border to their west. They number about 300,000 and are related to the Suku people. They live in the forest and savanna region between the Kwango River and the Wamba River. They speak the Yaka language).

Their oral tradition states that Lunda arrived in Kwango in the 17th century and found people who were part of the kingdom of Kongo. Yaka was a title of honor given to the warriors of the kingdom of Kongo and this word can be found in the following Kongo sentence from the descendants of M'panzu : " « Beto, mayaka mbata; mayaka mpunza, mayaka mbele. »"(Translation: « We, we catch the blows, arrows and swords. » (that the enemies throw at them)).

The colonial Portuguese called them Jagas, and their name may be derived from the Kikongo verb Kuyaka which means "to grab, to take, to hold" referring to the warriors of the kingdom of Kongo and later referring to the invaders. In the 17th century and onwards, the Portuguese used the word Jagas (English: Yakas) to refer to any rootless and vagabond peoples, even if peaceful, in their colonies.

History

Exodus to Kwango Region and establishment of the Yaka kingdom

King Kabamba  led the exodus of the Lunda westward around the 17th century, the most organized expedition towards the conquest of the Kwango region in the kingdom of Kongo. Some Lunda had already preceded this. These Lunda conquerors were endowed with three major qualities: diplomacy, sociability and The organization, which enabled them to found the Yaka kingdom in the seventeenth century, harmoniously integrating the pre-established Kongo nations. The Lunda used this "soft power", more than fighting, to favour the union of the two peoples, Lunda and Kongo, under the kingdom Yaka. Ethnologists and sociologists unanimously agree that, throughout Belgian colonial history, this kingdom was one of the best organized and Especially the most resistant to Western penetration.

The name Yaka is a title that the Kongo gave to their warriors. Upon the arrival of Lunda, the kingdom of Kongo was already weakened by Portuguese incursions. Thus, the resistance that the Lunda find in the Kwango region is that of the isolated local tribes Kongo, including the Mbala, Tsamba, Hungana, Pindi, Ngongo, rather than that of a United Kongo kingdom. The Lunda, these "biluwa", or foreigners, which Nothing resisted on their passage, capable of catching bullets and arrows, were also called "Iluwa" (foreigners) or Bayaka (Catchers of the balls and the arrows). Both the Lunda that arrived and the kongo warriors had similar traits, hence the exact titles being given to them.

The Lunda, who had an interest in integrating into their political organization the local tribes who had not fled the invasion or who did not want to fight, had in turn adopted the identity "Yaka" which, in addition to conferring on them a title of nobility of the "invincible", integrated them better In their new country.

They had also gradually adopted the Kongo language (hence the Kiyaka language being spoken amongst them, an offshoot of Kikongo). Much more, Lunda chiefs married Kongo women. The offspring identified themselves as Yaka rather than Lunda. Thus, the Yaka appellation had established itself as a generic identity Of the Lunda and Kongo inhabiting territories area under the authority of the Kabamba -Lunda, namely the territories of Kabamba -Lunda, Kenge and Popokabaka.

The Lunda of Nzofu later came in the territory of Kahemba retain the Lunda identity and language. As for the territory of Feshi, they emigrated there in the middle of the 18th century from the Basuku, a group of Kongo, who disassociated themselves from the power of Kabamba -Lunda and whose leader "Meni Kongo" refused to submit to the authority of the latter. Some other Kongo groups: the Mbala, Tsamba, Hungana, Pindi and Ngongo, etc. Had already emigrated to the Kwilu, leaving behind them, brothers and sisters who, together with the Lunda, composed the Yaka kingdom. The five territories that make up Kwango are therefore a binational space, Kongo and Lunda.

The reconciliation is thus the end of the wars of conquest between Kongo ethnic groups and the Lunda in Kwango was sealed by a ceremony and a particular ceremony in which the chief Meni Kongo representing Of the original Tsamba clans of Feshi and the Lunda chiefs were to share the parrot, dog and cat raw meat. At the end of this ceremony, the representatives of two nations buried their war weapons and promised peaceful coexistence forever. The Kongo and the Lunda of Kwango have lived in perfect harmony since the beginning of the 19th century.

Contact with the Europeans powers
When the administration of Leopold II arrived in Kwango after their establishment in Bas-Congo, Kwango Was an organized kingdom; The power of Kabamba -Lunda was legitimized and respected by all the peoples, Kongo and Lunda. It was also well represented on the whole kingdom that stretched from Kabamba-Lunda to Popokabaka through the present territory of Kenge. Peace between the Bayaka (Kongo and Lunda under the power of the Kabamba  -Lunda), their brothers, the Basuku of Meni Kongo in the Feshi and the Lunda of Nzofu in Kahemba.

It was therefore not by default of hospitality that the agents of the Belgian administration came up against a refusal in Kwango. They represented a power that could not coexist easily with the existing political power.

According to Crawford Young, the Lunda empires in Kwango and Katanga had understood that colonial occupation was an aggression to repel and fight. The other groups, apart from a few scattered revolts including that of Bapendé, had behaved as if the exploration and occupation of their spaces by strangers were normal. (C. Young, 1965: 295-6).

The resistance Of Kabamba against the European power
By the year 1890, a skilled administrator named Dhanis came to negotiate his acceptance with King "Kabamba" faustin. It was not even with his replacement of the name of Dussart who sought to impose the Leopold administration on Kwango even by force. It was then that in 1892 and 1893 there were two wars ranked between the two armies, that of the Kabamba  faustin and that of the Leopoldian administration in which there were considerable losses on both sides. If the principal Belgian agent perished in the first war of 1892, the one which followed in 1893 with a greater reinforcement of soldiers of the public force saw the assassination of the Kabamba  faustin. It was also the beginning of the destabilization of the kings, but not that of the kingdom or the resistance. In fact, the kings who were enthroned after this revolting event showed themselves more intransigent with respect to submission to the power of whites. Thus, faced with repression, they had the choice either to go into exile with their brothers, the Lunda of Angola, or to undergo forced relegation to Banningville or elsewhere. Mulombo kings Désiré Nkulu and Chief Munene Nkenzi were deported respectively, while the kabamba Koko Kodia Puanga found refuge in Angola in 1915. After the two bloody wars of 1892 and 1893, when the Kwango was militarily armed, the resistance assumed passive form. This took many forms, ranging from the subtle violence by leopard men "Masiona" to civil disobedience and the refusal to serve any power of oppression, to participate in any enterprise or to obey any colonial injunction. It was this passive resistance that continued throughout the colonial era until independence. When in 1908, Leopold II ceded the Congo to Belgium, the colonial administration, to whom the narrative of the resistance Yaka had already been made, tried to occupy the Kwango by force, but she stumbled upon the civil resistance whose main manifestation was the refusal of cooperation with the colonial agents. Even after the assassination in 1893 of the kabamba Tsiimba Nkumbi, under which open resistance was waged, the Bayaka continued civic resistance. Because of the unfortunate incidents of the conflict, and after 2 years of colonial military siege, the colonial mission in Kwango was abandoned. By way of punishment and fear

That the Kwango hindered the colonial work and wished to overthrows the sovereignty of the Congo, in the hands of the colonial administration, which in turn forced to administration to put the Kwango on hold; Which meant that no development project could be undertaken. This did not prevent the Bayaka associating themselves with nationalists message of Lumumba, due to their strong presence in Kinshasa, only a century later, they heavily precipitate in the movement of independence, especially as the party that brought them together "LUKA "(The Kwangolese Union for Freedom and Independence) which had as its main objective the independence. The Bayaka, by their strong mobilization in Kinshasa, contributed strongly to the events that precipitated the independence of the Congo in 1959 - 1960.

The root cause of the Bayaka’s denigration
If the Bayaka have a history so glorious, where is the disparagement they are subjected to? The denigration of the Bayaka was originally the work of the colonial agents. The latter, after having abandoned the Kwango, were to create the division to better establish their authority in neighbouring Bas-Congo and Kwilu. Afterwards, they began spreading propaganda about the Bayaka, claiming them to be "warriors and savages", as they did not accept western civilization. This became the means of dividing and reigning. This is how, from the machinations of colonialists, stereotypes stick to the identity of Yaka, especially in Kinshasa, the capital, where all the tribes of the Congo eventually meet. Nevertheless, as can be seen in the writings of sociologists And Belgian ethnologists, the colonial administration recognized the organization and dynamism of the Bayaka. As all slanderous statements are made away from Kwango, or whispering, the Bayaka have imperturbably pursued their traditional activities in all areas: art, craftsmanship, construction, hunting, fishing and agriculture.

The Bayaka fell victim to their exceptional resistance to colonial oppression and exploitation. Those of the Kwango, have among other things, resisted fiercely efforts of "pacification" of the Force Publique and Leopold II's administration.

The Yaka people are a matrilineal society that includes patrilineal lineage as family name. Their villages have chiefs , who are recognized by the Congo government as a political office.

Their Traditional Religion has the concept of Ndzambyaphuungu, or a Creator God who resides in the sky, but this creator is not a part of their celebrations or rituals. The religious practices and ceremonies are instead directed towards the Bambuta or the spirits of the ancestors, and these are also part of healing dances during illnesses.

The Yaka farm cassava, sweet potatoes, and corn as staple source of food, and supplement this with fish and game meat. They have traditionally hunted with the help of hunting dogs. In contemporary times, they are also migrant workers in urban areas.

The Yaka are notable for their arts and handicrafts. They make statues, portraits, baskets, carved objects, masks, tools for cooking, building, hunting, fishing or entertaining with additions of instruments such as drums. Their masks are bulky, distinctive with upturned noses and eyes shaped in the form of globules. These masks were frequently used in various Traditional Religion ceremonies. Their sculptures called Mbwoolo and their carved slit drum called Mukoku are regionally famous and used in ritual dances.

References

Bibliography
Bourgeois, Arthur P. (1985) The Yaka and Suku. Leiden: Brill.

Yaka
Yaka